Merhale was an Ottoman unit of length.
 
8 fersahs were equal to 1 merhale. Fersah was based on the distance covered by a horse in normal gait per hour. Exact definition was 5685 meters.

So 1 merhale can be converted to meters.

References

Ottoman units of measurement